Fernando Franco García (born 1976) is a Spanish film editor, director and screenwriter.

Biography 
Fernando Franco García was born in Seville in 1976. He earned a licentiate degree in audiovisual communication from the University of Seville and a diploma in film editing from the ECAM. Already a seasoned film editor, his feature film directorial debut Wounded (2013) earned him a Goya Award for Best New Director and a nomination to the Goya Award for Best Original Screenplay. His debuting directorial efforts were followed by Dying (2017) and The Rite of Spring (2022).

Accolades

References 

Living people
People from Seville
Spanish film editors
21st-century Spanish screenwriters
Spanish film directors
1976 births
University of Seville alumni